Lyubov Sergeevna Sokolova (July 31, 1921June 6, 2001) was a Soviet and Russian cinema actress, named a People's Artist of the USSR. She played more than 300 film roles.

Biography  
Lyubov Sokolova studied cinematography with Boris Bibikov and Olga Pyzhova, graduating in 1946.

From 1951 to 1956, she was an actress with the Drama Theatre Group of the Soviet Forces in Germany (Potsdam). She was a studio actress from 1946 to 1951 and in 1956.

Sokolova had her movie debut in 1948, as the simple village woman Varvara in The Story of a Real Man. Some of the films she acted in included Quiet Flows the Don, Splendid Days, The story of Asya Klyachina, Far from Moscow, Shine, Shine, My Star, Crime and Punishment, Walking the Streets of Moscow, Thirty Three, The Irony of Fate, Moscow, My Love, White Bim Black Ear, Live Till Monday, Belorussian Station, Do Not Shoot at White Swans, Gentlemen of Fortune, From Dawn Till Sunset, Crash – Cop's Daughter.

In 1990, Sokolova was People's Artist of the Soviet Union. She was awarded many medals, including for Courage and for Labour Valour.

In Autumn 1994, Sokolova and Maya Bulgakova were victims of an accident as their car crashed into a pole. The actress was in intensive care and discharged after a few weeks, but Bulgakova died a few days later, without ever regaining consciousness.

Sokolova died on 6 June 2001 of a heart attack and was buried in Moscow, at the Kuntsevo Cemetery, near the grave of her son.

Family
 First husband – Georgy Arapovsky, whom she met while studying at the film school.
 Her second husband was director and screenwriter Georgy Danelia. They lived together for about 26 years. In 1959 they had a son, director and poet Nikolai Sokolov-Danelia, who died at the age of 26.

Selected filmography
1941 – Masquerade as girl of the ball  (episode) 
1951 – Far from Moscow as Olga Fyodorovna
1957 – The Cranes Are Flying as soldier woman  (episode)
1958 – And Quiet Flows the Don
1959 – Ballad of a Soldier as a woman in the market  (episode)
1960 – Splendid Days as Polina
1963 – Introduction to Life as Vasya and Lyusa's mother
1964 – The Alive and the Dead as doctor (episode)
1964 – Walking the Streets of Moscow as Kolka's mother
1965 – Thirty Three as Travkin's wife
1966 – Beware of the Car as judge
1966 – The Story of Asya Klyachina as Maria
1968 – We'll Live Till Monday as Levikova
1970 – Shine, Shine, My Star as Fyodor's wife
1970 – Crime and Punishment as Yelizaveta
1971 – Belorussian Station as Luba Prikhodko
1971 – Gentlemen of Fortune as kindergarten manager
1972 – Happy Go Lucky as train conductor (episode)
1972 – Privalov's Millions as Maria Bakhareva
1974 – Earthly Love as district committee member
1974 – Moscow, My Love as costume designer
1974 – Sokolovo as teacher
1975 – From Dawn Till Sunset as Pelagia Rozhnova
1976 – The Irony of Fate as Nadya's mother
1977 – White Bim Black Ear as switch woman (episode) 
1980 – A Few Days from the Life of I.I. Oblomov as seeing off woman (episode)
1980 – Do Not Shoot at White Swans as zoo worker
1981 – Could One Imagine? as Lisa
1983 – Return from Orbit as Sofia Petrovna
1983 – Quarantine as aunt Katya
1985 – Do Not Marry, Girls as Praskovya Ilinichna
1985 – The Most Charming and Attractive as Nadya's mother
1988 – The Life of Klim Samgin as Anfimovna
1989 – Crash – Cop's Daughter as Yuliya Nikolaevna
1991 – Lost in Siberia as Klava
1994 – Assia and the Hen with the Golden Eggs as Maria

References

External links
 
 Lyubov Sokolova  Online Film Teatr.ru
  Tomb Lyubov Sokolova Kuntsevo Cemetery 

1921 births
2001 deaths
People from Ivanovo
Russian film actresses
Soviet film actresses
People's Artists of the USSR
People's Artists of the RSFSR
Gerasimov Institute of Cinematography alumni
Burials at Kuntsevo Cemetery
20th-century Russian women